HITRAN (an acronym for High Resolution Transmission) molecular spectroscopic database is a compilation of spectroscopic parameters used to simulate and analyze the transmission and emission of light in gaseous media, with an emphasis on planetary atmospheres. The knowledge of spectroscopic parameters for transitions between energy levels in molecules (and atoms) is essential for interpreting and modeling the interaction of radiation (light) within different media.

For half a century, HITRAN has been considered to be an international standard which provides the user a recommended value of parameters for millions of transitions for different molecules. HITRAN includes both experimental and theoretical data which are gathered from a worldwide network of contributors as well as from articles, books, proceedings, databases, theses, reports, presentations, unpublished data, papers in-preparation and private communications. A major effort is then dedicated to evaluating and processing the spectroscopic data. A single transition in HITRAN has many parameters, including a default 160-byte fixed-width format used since HITRAN2004. Wherever possible, the retrieved data are validated against accurate laboratory data.

The original version of HITRAN was compiled by the US Air Force Cambridge Research Laboratories (1960s) in order to enable surveillance of military aircraft detected through the terrestrial atmosphere.  One of the early applications of HITRAN was a program called Atmospheric Radiation Measurement (ARM) for the US Department of Energy. In this program spectral atmospheric measurements were made around the globe in order to better understand the balance between the radiant energy that reaches Earth from the sun and the energy that flows from Earth back out to space. The US Department of Transportation also utilized HITRAN in its early days for monitoring the gas emissions (NO, SO2, NO2) of super-sonic transports flying at high altitude. HITRAN was first made publicly available in 1973 and today there are a multitude of ongoing and future NASA satellite missions which incorporate HITRAN. One of the NASA missions currently utilizing HITRAN is the Orbiting Carbon Observatory (OCO) which measures the sources and sinks of CO2 in the global atmosphere. HITRAN is a free resource and is currently maintained and developed at the Center for Astrophysics  Harvard & Smithsonian, Cambridge MA, USA (CFA/HITRAN).

HITRAN is the worldwide standard for calculating or simulating atmospheric molecular transmission and radiance from the microwave through ultraviolet region of the spectrum. The HITRAN database is officially released on a quadrennial basis, with updates posted in the intervening years on HITRANonline. There is a new journal article published in conjunction with the most recent release of the HITRAN database, and users are strongly encouraged to use the most recent edition. Throughout HITRAN's history, there have been around 50,000 unique users of the database and in recent years there are over 24,000 users registered on HITRANonline. There are YouTube tutorials on the HITRANonline webpage to answer frequently asked questions by users.

Line-by-Line
The current version, HITRAN2020, contains 55 molecules in the line-by-line portion of HITRAN along with some of their most significant isotopologues (144 isotopologues in total). These data are archived as a multitude of high-resolution line transitions, each containing many spectral parameters required for high-resolution simulations.

Absorption Cross-Sections
In addition to the traditional line-by-line spectroscopic absorption parameters, the HITRAN database contains information on absorption cross-sections where the line-by-line parameters are absent or incomplete. Typically HITRAN includes absorption cross-sections for heavy polyatomic molecules (with low-lying vibrational modes) which are difficult for detailed analysis due to the high density of the spectral bands/lines, broadening effects, isomerization, and overall modeling complexity. There are 327 molecular species in the current edition of the database provided as cross-section files. The cross-section files are provided in the HITRAN format described on the official HITRAN website (http://hitran.org/docs/cross-sections-definitions/).

Collision-Induced Absorption
The HITRAN compilation also provides collision-induced absorption (CIA) that was first introduced into HITRAN in the 2012 edition. CIA refers to absorption by transient electric dipoles induced by the interaction between colliding molecules. Instructions for accessing the CIA data files can be found on HITRAN/CIA.

Aerosol Refractive Indices
HITRAN2020 also has an aerosols refractive indices section, with data in the visible, infrared, and millimeter spectral ranges of many types of cloud and aerosol particles. Knowledge of the refractive indices of the aerosols and cloud particles and their size distributions is necessary in order to specify their optical properties.

HITEMP
HITEMP is the molecular spectroscopic database analogous to HITRAN for high-temperature modeling of the spectra of molecules in the gas phase. HITEMP encompasses many more bands and transitions than HITRAN for eight absorbers: H2O, CO2, N2O, CO, CH4, NO, NO2 and OH. Due to the extremely large number of transitions required for high-temperature simulations, it was necessary to provide the HITEMP data as separate files to that of HITRAN. The HITEMP line lists retain the same 160-character format that was used for earlier editions of HITRAN. There are numerous applications for HITEMP data, some examples include the thermometry of high-temperature environments, analysis of combustion processes, and modeling spectra of atmospheres in the Solar System, exoplanets, brown dwarfs, and stars.

HAPI
A Python library HAPI (HITRAN Application Programming Interface) has been developed which serves as a tool for absorption and transmission calculations as well as comparisons of spectroscopic data sets. HAPI extends the functionality of the main site, in particular, for the calculation of spectra using several types of line shape calculations, including the flexible HT (Hartmann-Tran) profile. This HT line shape can also be reduced to a number of conventional line profiles such as Gaussian (Doppler), Lorentzian, Voigt, Rautian, Speed-Dependent Voigt and Speed-Dependent Rautian. In addition to accounting for pressure, temperature and optical path length, the user can include a number of instrumental functions to simulate experimental spectra. HAPI is able to account for broadening of lines due to mixtures of gases as well as make use of all broadening parameters supplied by HITRAN. This includes the traditional broadeners (air, self) as well as additional parameters for CO2, H2O, H2 and He broadening. The following spectral functions can be calculated in the current version #1 of HAPI: 
 absorption coefficient
 absorption spectrum
 transmittance spectrum
 radiance spectrum

HAPIEST (an acronym for HITRAN Application Programming Interface and Efficient Spectroscopic Tools) is a graphical user interface allowing users to access some of the functionality provided by HAPI without any knowledge of Python programming, including downloading data from HITRAN, and plotting of spectra and cross-sections. The source code for HAPIEST is available on GitHub (HAPIEST), along with binary distributions for Mac and PC.

See also
 Atmospheric radiative--transfer codes
 Absorption spectrum
 MODTRAN

References

Further reading

External links
 hitran.org Official HITRANonline website for accessing HITRAN data
 HITRAN on the Web
 HITRAN/CIA HITRAN CIA data access
 HAPI The page for HAPI on the HITRAN website
 HAPIEST The GitHub repository for HAPIEST

Atmospheric radiative transfer codes
Spectroscopy